Exterminate All the Brutes is an internationally co-produced documentary miniseries revolving around colonization and genocide, directed and narrated by Raoul Peck. The series consists of four episodes and premiered in the United States on April 7, 2021, on HBO. It premiered in the United Kingdom on May 1, 2021, on Sky Documentaries. The series takes its name from Sven Lindqvist's book with the same name, on which it is partially based, a phrase which Lindqvist in turn borrowed from Joseph Conrad's novella Heart of Darkness, in which the quote "Exterminate all the brutes" appears.

Plot
The series follows colonization and multiple genocides, and the effect of both, alongside imperialism and white supremacy:

In the series premiere, "The Disturbing Confidence of Ignorance," filmmaker Raoul Peck sets out to illuminate the intertwined currents of hate and bigotry running through history. Focusing on the United States' legacy as a colonial power, Peck explores how race first became institutionalized, the Nazi program of "elimination" and its antecedents in the West, and the looting of the African continent in a "gentlemen's agreement."

In the second episode, "Who the F*** is Columbus," Peck revisits the stories of Christopher Columbus, the Alamo, and the Trail of Tears from an indigenous perspective, showing how "official" history is shaped by those in power and solidified by myth and popular culture. Next, he examines the "doctrine of discovery" used to justify the enslavement of millions of Africans and questions his own story within these narratives.

In the third installment of the series, "Killing at a Distance or... How I Thoroughly Enjoyed the Outing," Peck looks back at human migration, trade, and weaponry, and shows how Europeans used industrialized steel to conduct warfare from ever-greater distances. Then, he explores the endless cycle of militarization throughout the centuries – from George Washington's efforts to jump-start American arms manufacturing, to the Monroe Doctrine, and finally, to the horrors of the bombing of civilians in Hiroshima and Nagasaki.

In the series finale, "The Bright Colors of Fascism," Peck explores the challenge of reconciling America's true history with its ideals of freedom and democracy, pointing to the struggle for native representation and the legacy of slavery in institutionalized racism today. Reflecting on his time in Berlin, Peck links the modern resurgence of white nationalism with fascism, slavery, colonialism, and Nazism.

Cast
 Raoul Peck as himself, the narrator
 Josh Hartnett as White Man, a recurring representation of colonialism.
 Casia Ankarsparre as Chieftain Ya'Hoo Cuchee, a recurring representation of indigenous women.
 Richard Brake as General
 Alex Descas
 Bakary Sangaré
 Denis Lyons as Lee
 Eriq Ebouaney
 Stefan Konarske as Nurse
 Shane Woodward as Reporter
 Aïssa Maïga
 Fraser James
 Ettore d'Alessandro as Nobleman
 Habib Diakhaby
 Edward Arnold as Missionary
 Zinedine Soualem
 Mahamat-Saleh Haroun
 Sven Lindkvist as himself (archive footage)

Episodes

Production
Raoul Peck began working on the project after an executive at HBO agreed to produce a documentary of his on any topic. The series is based on the books Exterminate All the Brutes by Sven Lindqvist, An Indigenous Peoples' History of the United States by Roxanne Dunbar-Ortiz, and Silencing the Past by Michel-Rolph Trouillot.

In February 2020, it was announced Raoul Peck would direct a 4-episode documentary series revolving around colonization and genocide for HBO, with HBO Documentary Films set to produce, with Josh Hartnett set to star as the lead in scripted scenes.

Filming
On July 30, 2020, Hartnett revealed that his segments were filmed in Paris, France before the COVID-19 lockdown.

Reception

Critical reception
Exterminate All the Brutes received positive reviews from the critics. It holds a 84% approval rating on review aggregator website Rotten Tomatoes, based on 25 reviews, with a weighted average of 8.25/10. The site's critical consensus reads, "While Exterminate All the Brutes perhaps packs a little too much into its limited runtime, it remains a powerful, necessary examination of the horrors of historical colonialism and its lingering impact on the world today." On Metacritic, the series holds a rating of 83 out of 100, based on 13 critics, indicating "universal acclaim".

Accolades

See also

 List of films featuring colonialism

References

External links
 
 
 
 

2020s American documentary television series
2020s American television miniseries
2021 American television series debuts
2021 American television series endings
Documentaries about politics
English-language television shows
HBO original programming
HBO documentary films
Films directed by Raoul Peck
Peabody Award-winning television programs